Port Union may refer to:

 Port Union, Newfoundland and Labrador, Canada
 Port Union, Ohio, United States
 Port Union, Toronto, a neighborhood in Toronto, Ontario, Canada